Cross Hands Halt railway station served Pilning, South Gloucestershire, England from 1928 to 1964 on the Severn Beach Line.

History 
The station opened on 9 July 1928 by the Great Western Railway. Before the Severn Tunnel was built, this line was the main line to South Wales via the New Passage ferry. The station was closed to both passengers and goods traffic on 23 November 1964.

References

External links 

Former Great Western Railway stations
Railway stations in Great Britain opened in 1928
Railway stations in Great Britain closed in 1964
1928 establishments in England
1964 disestablishments in England
Beeching closures in England